Son Young-hee (born 24 April 1993) is a South Korean weightlifter. She competed in the women's +75 kg event at the 2016 Summer Olympics in Rio de Janeiro, Brazil. She won the gold medal in the women's +87 kg event at the 2021 World Weightlifting Championships held in Tashkent, Uzbekistan.

References

External links
 

1993 births
Living people
South Korean female weightlifters
Olympic weightlifters of South Korea
Weightlifters at the 2016 Summer Olympics
Weightlifters at the 2014 Asian Games
Weightlifters at the 2018 Asian Games
Medalists at the 2018 Asian Games
Asian Games medalists in weightlifting
Asian Games silver medalists for South Korea
World Weightlifting Championships medalists
Place of birth missing (living people)
21st-century South Korean women